The table below lists the decisions (known as reasons) delivered from the bench by the Supreme Court of Canada during 2012. The table illustrates what reasons were filed by each justice in each case, and which justices joined each reason. This list, however, does not include reasons on motions.

Reasons

2012 Statistics

References
 2012 decisions: CanLII, LexUM

Supreme Court of Canada reasons by year